Jingpho (Jinghpaw, Chingp'o, Jìngphòʔ gà / ဈိာင်ဖေါစ်) or Kachin, is a Tibeto-Burman language of the Sal branch mainly spoken in Kachin State, Burma and Yunnan, China. There are many meanings for Jingpho. In the Jingpho language, Jingpho means people or Jinghpho tribe. The term "Kachin language" can refer either to the Jingpho language or to a group of languages spoken by various ethnic groups in the same region as Jingpo: Lisu, Lashi, Rawang, Zaiwa, Lhao Vo, Achang and Jingpho. These languages are from distinct branches of the highest level of the Tibeto-Burman family. The Jingpho alphabet is based on the Latin script.

The ethnic Jingpho (or Kachin) are the primary speakers of Jingpho language, numbering approximately 900,000 speakers. The Turung of Assam in India speak a Jingpho dialect with many Assamese loanwords, called Singpho.

Jingpho syllable finals can consist of vowels, nasals or oral stops.

Dialects
There are at least 16 Jingphoish (Kachinic) varieties (Kurabe 2014:59). The demographic and location information listed below is drawn from Kurabe (2014). Standard Jingpho and Nkhum are the best described varieties, whereas the Jingphoish varieties of India have been recently documented by Stephen Morey. Jingphoish varieties in northern Kachin State remain little described.

The Ethnologue lists Duleng (Dalaung, Dulong), Dzili (Jili), Hkaku (Hka-Hku), and Kauri (Gauri, Guari, Hkauri). According to the Ethnologue, Dzili might be a separate language, whereas Hkaku and Kauri are only slightly different.

Other underdescribed Jingphoish varieties include Mungji and Zawbung. Shanke is a recently described language closely related to Jingpho, although its speakers identify themselves as Naga.

Southern
Standard Jingpho is the standard variety of Jingpho as used among the Kachin people in Myanmar, as well as by non-Kachin ethnic minorities in Kachin State. Most speakers live in Kachin State, though some live in Shan State and Sagaing Division. It is spoken primarily in Myitkyina, Bhamo, and Kutkai. Standard Jingpho as spoken in Shan State often has ʔə- added to monosyllabic words, and also places the interrogative particle ʔi before verbs.
Nkhum / Enkun 恩昆 is spoken in Lianghe, Ruili, Longchuan, and Luxi counties of Yunnan, China. It is the most widely spoken Jingpho dialect in China. The Nkhum dialect displays tense-lax register contrast, whereas Shadan does not. Although the Shadan dialect frequently has -ŋ, Nkhum often does not. The Tongbiguan 铜壁关 variety of Nkhum is used as the Jingpho standard variety in China. Small pockets of speakers are also found in Gengma County.
Shadan / Shidan 石丹 is spoken in Yunnan, China. It is spoken in the townships of Kachang 卡昌 and Taiping 太平 (in Getong 格同 of Mengzhi 蒙支, Zhengtonghong 正通硔, and Longpen 龙盆), located in Yingjiang County 盈江县.
Gauri / Khauri is spoken in the Gauri Hills, located to the east of Bhamo. Villages include Prang Hkudung, Man Dau, Hkarawm Kawng, Manda, Ka Daw, Lamai Bang, Bum Wa, Ma Htang, Jahkai, and Loi Ming. In China, Gauri is spoken by about 300 people in Hedao 贺岛 and Hongka 硔卡 villages of Longchuan County, and in Kachang 卡场镇 of Yingjiang County.
Mengzhi 蒙支 is spoken by about 200 people in the two villages of Getong 格同 and Zhengtongyou 正通猶 in Mengzhi 蒙支,  Yingjiang County 盈江县.
Thingnai is spoken near Mohnyin, southern Kachin State.

Small pockets of Jingpho speakers are also scattered across Gengma County 耿马县, including the following villages (Dai Qingxia 2010). Dai (2010) also includes 1,000-word vocabulary lists of the Yingjiang 盈江, Xinzhai 新寨, and Caoba 草坝 dialects.
Jingpo Xinzhai 景颇新寨, Mangkang Village 芒抗村, Hepai Township 贺派乡
Nalong 那拢组, Nongba Village 弄巴村, Gengma Town 耿马镇
Hewen 贺稳组, Jingxin Village 景信村, Mengding Town 孟定镇
Hebianzhai 河边寨, Qiushan Village 邱山村, Mengding Town 孟定镇
Caobazhai 草坝寨, Mang'ai Village 芒艾村, Mengding Town 孟定镇

Northeastern
Dingga: a recently discovered Jingpho variety spoken near Putao, Kachin State, in the villages of Ding Ga, Ding Ga Gabrim, Tsa Gung Ga, Layang Ga, Dai Mare, and Mărawt Ga. These villages are all located between the Shang Hka and Da Hka rivers in northern Kachin State. There are between 2,000 and 3,000 speakers.
Duleng is spoken near Putao, in Machanbaw, and in the Nam Tisang valley of Kachin State. The only published description is that of Yue (2006).
Dingphan is spoken near Putao, Kachin State.
Jilí / Dzili
Khakhu is spoken near Putao, Kachin State.
Shang is spoken near Putao, Kachin State.
Tsasen is spoken in northwestern Kachin State.

Northwestern
Singpho (Northwestern Jingphoish) varieties of Assam and Arunachal Pradesh, India include the following.
Diyun is spoken in India.
Numphuk is spoken by about 2,000 speakers in 20 villages, including Ingthong, Ketetong, Inthem, Kumsai, Bisa, Wagun 1, Wagun 2, Wagun 3, Wakhet Na, Kherem Bisa, Guju, and Giding. These villages are situated along the Burhi Dihing river in Assam, which is called the Numhpuk Hka river in Numphuk.
Tieng is spoken in India.
Turung is spoken by about 1,200 speakers mainly in the Titabor area (in the 3 villages of Pathargaon (Na Kthong), Tipomia, and Pahukatia) and the Dhonsiri river valley (in the villages of Balipathar, Rengmai, and Basapathar). There are many Tai loanwords in Turung. Some Turung speakers also self-identify as ethnic Tai.

Internal classification
Kurabe (2014) classifies seven Jingphoish dialects as follows.
Proto-Jingpho
Southern
Gauri (Khauri) 
Standard Jingpho, Nkhum (Enkun) 
Northern
Northwestern
Numphuk 
Turung 
Northeastern
Duleng 
Dingga 

The Southern branch is characterized the loss of Proto-Jingpho final stop *-k in some lexical items. The Northern branch is characterized by the following mergers of Proto-Jingpho phonemes (Kurabe 2014:60).
 *ts- and *c-
 *dz- and *j-
 *ʔy- and *∅- (before front vowels)
merger of Proto-Jingpho plain and preglottalized sonorants

Grammar
Jingpho has verbal morphology that marks the subject and the direct object. Here is one example (the tonemes are not marked). The verb is 'to be' (rai).

Phonology 
The following is in Standard Jingpho:

Consonants 

 is only marginal and often appears in loanwords.
 can also be heard as a fricative .

Vowels

Tones 
Jingpho has four tones in open syllables, and two tones in closed syllables (high and low). Tones are not usually marked in writing, although they can be transcribed using diacritics as follows:

Vocabulary 
The Jingpho lexicon contains a large number of words of both Tibeto-Burman and non-Tibeto-Burman stock, including Burmese and Shan. Burmese loan words reflect two stratas, an older stratum reflecting the phonology of conservative written Burmese, and a newer stratum reflecting words drawn from modern Burmese phonology. The older strata consist of vocabulary borrowed from Burmese via Shan, which also exhibits the pre-modern phonology of Burmese vocabulary. Jingpho has also borrowed a large number of lexical items from Shan, with which it has been in close ethnolinguistic contact for several centuries. Jingpho, as the lingua franca in the northern highlands of Myanmar, has in turn been the source language of vocabulary into other regional languages like Rawang and Zaiwa.

Orthography
The Jingpho writing system is a Latin-based alphabet consisting of 23 letters, and very little use of diacritical marks, originally created by American Baptist missionaries in the late 19th century. It is considered one of the simplest writing systems of the Tibeto-Burman languages, as other languages utilise their own alphabets, such as abugidas or syllabary.

Ola Hanson, one of the first people to establish an alphabet, arrived in Myanmar in 1890, learnt the language and wrote the first Kachin–English dictionary. In 1965, the alphabet was reformed to distinguish further consonants.

Initials

 k.y – [k.j]
 n-g – [n.g]
 pf – [pf~ʰp]
 p.y – [p.j]

Finals

Burmese orthography 
Jingpho is also written in the Burmese alphabet.

Consonants
 ဗ – b – [b]
 ပ – p – [p]
 ဖ – hp – [pʰ]
 မ – m – [m]
 ဝ – w – [w]
 ဒ – d – [d]
 တ – t – [t]
 ထ – ht – [tʰ]
 န – n – [n]
 ည – ny – [nʲ]
 စ – s – [s~sʰ]
 ၡ – sh – [ɕ]
 ရ – r – [ɻ~ʒ]
 လ – l – [l]
 ယ – y – [j]
 ဇ – z – [t͡s]
 ဆ – ts – [t͡sʰ]
 ချ – ch – [t͡ɕ]
 ဂျ – j – [d͡ʑ]
 ဂ – g – [g]
 က – k – [k]
 ခ – hk – [kʰ]
 င – ng – [ŋ]
 ဟ – h – [h]
 အ – ' – [ʔ]

 ပ် – pf – [pf~ʰp]]
 ဖွ – f – [f]
 ွ – -w- – [-ʷ-]
 ြ – -r- – [-ᶼ-]
 ျ – -y- – [-ʲ-]

Vowels
[-a] is the inherent vowel in every syllable.
 ိ – i – [i]
 ု – u – [u]
 ေ – e – [e]
 ေါ – o – [o]

 ဝ် – -u – [-u]
 ယ် – -i – [-i]

Other diacritics
 ာ – tone
 ် – marks final consonant by silencing [-a]

References

Bibliography 
 景颇语-汉语词典 Jingpoyu – Hanyu cidian / Jingpho–Chinese dictionary, 戴庆夏 Dai Qingxia et al.
 景颇语语法 Jingpoyu yufa / Jingpho Grammar, 戴庆夏 Dai Qingxia et al.
 Structures élémentaires de la parenté, de Claude Lévi-Strauss, devotes a chapter to the study of parenthood in the Jingpho ethnicity.
 Inglish, Douglas. 2005. A Preliminary Ngochang – Kachin – English Lexicon. Payap University, Graduate School, Linguistics Department.
 Kurabe, Keita. 2014. "Phonological inventories of seven Jingphoish languages and dialects." In Kyoto University Linguistic Research 33: 57–88, Dec 2014.
 Kurabe, Keita. 2013. Kachin folktales told in Jinghpaw. Collection KK1 at catalog.paradisec.org.au [Open Access]. https://dx.doi.org/10.4225/72/59888e8ab2122
 Kurabe, Keita. 2017. Kachin culture and history told in Jinghpaw. Collection KK2 at catalog.paradisec.org.au [Open Access]. https://dx.doi.org/10.26278/5fa1707c5e77c

External links 

Glottolog | Jingpho 
Ethnologue | Jingpho 
OLAC resources | Kachin 
PARADISEC | Kachin folktales told in Jinghpaw 
PARADISEC | Kachin culture and history told in Jinghpaw 
Akyu Hpyi Laika: Jinghpaw Service Book (Portions of the Book of Common Prayer in Jinghpaw, 1957) digitized by Richard Mammana

Sal languages
Languages of China
Languages of Myanmar
Jingpo people